Todd Tilghman (born January 3, 1978) is an American pastor singer. He is the winner of season 18 of American talent competition The Voice. At the age of 42, he became the oldest winner in the series history, a record previously held by Josh Kaufman.

Personal life
Tilghman has been singing in church since he was eight years old. He is married to his high school sweetheart, Brooke, and is the father of eight children. Since 2011, he has been the lead pastor of Cornerstone Church in Meridian.
Tilghman's eldest son, Eagan Tilghman, was a contestant on NBC's Making It.

The Voice (2020)
Tilghman auditioned to The Voice in its 18th season with the song "We've Got Tonight". It was broadcast on February 24, 2020 turning all four chairs of judges Blake Shelton, Kelly Clarkson, Nick Jonas and John Legend. He became part of Team Blake.

He has the distinction of being the first artist to be aired that season and the first artist to be aired as being unanimously selected by the judges (however, this is not necessarily the case as the auditions are aired out of order).  He decided to compete in the team coached by Blake Shelton, proving to do the expected. His voice took him straight to the winners circle.

The performances of Tilghman were:

Awards and recognition

On May 23, 2020 an entire advertising section of the Meridian Star was devoted to him. It includes tributes by various local businesses, colleges and individuals including Meridian native Sela Ward.

A drive-thru parade honoring Tilghman was scheduled for Thursday evening, May 28, 2020.  The parade began at the Meridian Police Department on 22nd Avenue where participants driving vehicles with decorations honoring his win on "The Voice" drove toward Dumont Plaza, where Tilghman and his family were stationed. The event was hosted by the East Mississippi Business Development Corporation; Visit Meridian; and the City of Meridian.

Discography

Singles

References

External links
 Official Facebook page

American Pentecostals
People from Meridian, Mississippi
21st-century American singers
1978 births
Living people
21st-century American male singers
Singers from Mississippi
The Voice (franchise) contestants
The Voice (franchise) winners